Eduardo Marcelo Peña Bustamante (born 30 June 1975), known as Marcelo Peña, is a Chilean football manager and former player.

Early life
After being born in Chile, Peña emigrated with his family to Australia when he was a year old. He grew up in the western suburbs of Sydney.

Club career
Peña played his junior football with Marconi before moving back to Chile at the age of 17. He made his debut for Católica at the age of 18. He later had stints with Colo-Colo, Santiago Morning, Audax Italiano, Unión Española and Everton de Viña del Mar.

In 2005, he had a short stint with Bentleigh Greens in the Victorian Premier League in Australia.

International career
Peña played for Chile B against England B on 10 February 1998. Chile won by 2–1.

Coaching career
Peña worked as coach for the youth team of Universidad de Chile and as manager of Rangers de Talca in the Primera B de Chile. Also, he has been an assistant of Claudio Borghi for Argentinos Juniors and Boca Juniors.

Personal life
His son, Sebastián Peña, is a footballer who was with the Universidad de Chile youth ranks and next moved to Australia and joined Macarthur Rams, winning the 2022 NSW League Two.

References

1975 births
Living people
Chilean emigrants to Australia
Chilean footballers
Association football central defenders
Chile international footballers
Marconi Stallions FC players
Club Deportivo Universidad Católica footballers
Audax Italiano footballers
Santiago Morning footballers
Everton de Viña del Mar footballers
Colo-Colo footballers
Unión Española footballers
Persija Jakarta players
Bentleigh Greens SC players
Deportes Concepción (Chile) footballers
Chilean Primera División players
Indonesian Premier Division players
Chilean football managers
Rangers de Talca managers
Primera B de Chile managers
Chilean expatriate footballers
Expatriate footballers in Indonesia
Expatriate soccer players in Australia
Chilean expatriate sportspeople in Indonesia
Chilean expatriate sportspeople in Australia
Chilean expatriate football managers
Expatriate football managers in Argentina
Chilean expatriate sportspeople in Argentina